Mary-Anne O'Connor is an Australian novelist.

Biography
O'Connor grew up in Wahroonga, Sydney, the daughter of Dorn and Australian artist Kevin Best. In 2015 she published her first novel Gallipoli Street through HQ, later acquired by HarperCollins Australia. O'Connor has since published six subsequent novels through HarperCollins: Worth Fighting For (2016), War Flower (2017), In A Great Southern Land (2019), Where Fortune Lies (2020), Sisters of Freedom (2021), Dressed By Iris (2022),  and Never to Surrender (2023).

Bibliography
Novels

Gallipoli Street (2015)
Worth Fighting For (2016)
War Flower (2017)
In A Great Southern Land (2019)
Where Fortune Lies (2020)
Sisters of Freedom (2021)
Dressed By Iris (2022)
Never to Surrender (2023)

References

External links 
 Podcast: Mary-Anne O’Connor, Author of In a Great Southern Land, Discusses her Creative Family and Getting Published 
 Mary-Anne O'Connor Twitter Profile
 Mary-Anne O'Connor Official Website

21st-century Australian novelists
21st-century Australian women writers
Australian women novelists
Living people
Australian people of Irish descent
Australian people of Welsh descent
Australian people of English descent
Year of birth missing (living people)